Ole Christian Olsen Nauen (born 1939) is a Norwegian bell caster. 

He is the former owner of the Olsen Nauen Bell Foundry in Tønsberg, a family business that he took over in 1963. Under his leadership, the company further developed and new technology was introduced. Although retired, he continues to work at the company, which now headed by Morten Olsen-Nauen.

In 2007, Olsen Nauen was awarded the King's Medal of Merit in gold for his work as a bell caster.

References

Foundrymen
Recipients of the King's Medal of Merit in gold
People from Tønsberg
1939 births
Living people